Lanišće is a village and municipality in the mountainous Ćićarija area, Istria, Croatia. In 2011, the population of the village itself is 88, with a total of 329 residents in the municipality. Over 92.40% of the population are Croats. There are fourteen settlements in the municipality: Brest, Brgudac, Dane, Jelovice, Klenovšćak, Kropinjak, Lanišće, Podgaće, Prapoće, Račja Vas, Rašpor, Slum, Trstenik and Vodice.

Description
Municipality Lanišće was formed in 1992, with total area as the largest municipality in the Istria county, while by population density the smallest. There are fourteen settlements in the municipality, Brest, Brgudac, Dane, Jelovice, Klenovšćak, Kropinjak, Lanišće, Podgaće, Prapoće, Račja Vas, Rašpor, Slum, Trstenik and Vodice, and two hamlets, Brljavci and Črnehi, which are according to the statistical data attributed to the village Kropinjak. Almost all villages are mentioned since the 13th-14th century, and all villages are of mountainous character, located at altitudes from 500 m (Podgaće) to 740 m (Brgudac) above sea level.

Demography
Until 1900 and 1910, population has grown steadily, and the largest density was in 1900 with 33,8/km2. Until 1900, Vodice was the largest village in municipality, and after 1910 remained the second after Lanišće. Both villages until 1910 with population outnumbered Buzet. Many families and individuals in the period from the late 1800s until 1941 emigrated, mostly to countries in North and South America. The first stagnation was at the time of World War I, between 1910 and 1921, but it was followed by sudden increase until 1931 and 1936. The second and permanent period of stagnation followed after World War II (1945-1948). According to the 2011 census, municipality of Lanišće had 398 residents.

Municipality Lanišće 

Note: Emerged from old Buzet municipality. In 1921 part of data is contained in Buzet.

Lanišće (village) 

Note: In 1921 part of data is contained in Roč (near Buzet). In 1931 contains data from villages Brgudac, Podgaće, Prapoće, Račja Vas and Rašpor.

See also
Ćići

References

Bibliography

 

Sources

External links 

Lanišće homepage 
Reading room "Gorska Vila", Lanišće
KARST underground project "Speleo House", Vodice

Populated places in Istria County
Municipalities of Croatia